This is the list of notable stars in the constellation Draco.

See also
List of stars by constellation

References

Bibliography

List
Draco